The Olympus 35 RC is a 35 mm rangefinder camera manufactured by Olympus in Japan in the 1970s. It claimed to be the smallest 35 mm rangefinder with automatic exposure control and manual override. Its viewfinder readouts for selected aperture/shutter speed settings are unique for a compact camera, later reiterated in the 35RD.

Specification
 Lens: E. Zuiko 42mm f/2.8 5 elements in 4 groups
 Focus range: 0.9 meters to infinity
 Shutter-speed: B, 1/15, 1/30, 1/60, 1/125, 1/250, 1/500
 Aperture: 2.8, 4, 5.6, 8, 11, 16, 22
 Exposure modes: metered shutter-preferred automatic exposure, unmetered-manual override and flashmatic modes
 Filter size: 43.5mm
 Film speed scale: ASA 25–800
 Size: 11 × 7 × 5 cm (4" × 2" × 1")
 Weight: 410 grams

See also
 List of Olympus products
 Olympus 35RD
 Olympus 35SP
 Olympus XA

External links
 The Olympus 35-RC Rangefinder Camera, the essence of 35mm photography in a small package
 CameraQuest on the Olympus 35RC
 Ken Rockwell on the Olympus 35RC

35RC